Mike Lévy (born 24 June 1987), known professionally as Gesaffelstein, is a French music programmer, DJ, songwriter and record producer from Lyon. He has worked alongside artists such as The Weeknd, Daft Punk, Kanye West, A$AP Rocky, Electric Youth, Haim, Miss Kittin, The Hacker, Jean-Michel Jarre and Pharrell Williams.

Name
Gesaffelstein is a portmanteau of Gesamtkunstwerk ("total artwork" in German, also title of an album by the American electro group Dopplereffekt) and Albert Einstein.

Career
Mike Lévy was born in Lyon, France, in June 1987. He started producing music at the age of sixteen when he first played an analog synthesizer. He released his first EP in 2008 through the label OD Records. In 2009, he founded with The Hacker, Alex Reynaud and David Rimokh, the independent label Zone.

In July 2012, Gesaffelstein made the cover of DJ Mag with Brodinski. The same year, his track "Viol" was used by Citroën and Givenchy advertisings. He co-produced two tracks on Yeezus, the sixth album of American rapper Kanye West, including the lead single "Black Skinhead" and "Send It Up", both tracks produced with Kanye West, Daft Punk, Brodinski and Mike Dean.  On 28 October 2013, Gesaffelstein released his debut album Aleph under Parlophone Records and OWSLA (in North America only), which had been recorded since 2011. His remix of "Shockwave" by The Hacker is featured in the 2013 video game Grand Theft Auto V, on the Soulwax FM radio station. 

In 2015, Gesaffelstein released the single "Conquistador" in collaboration with Jean-Michel Jarre, which is present on the album Electronica 1: The Time Machine. He also produced the soundtrack for the French-Belgian 2015 film Maryland, directed by Alice Winocour.  In early 2018, he produced the tracks "I Was Never There" and "Hurt You" from The Weeknd's My Dear Melancholy, EP.

Gesaffelstein signed to Columbia Records in November 2018, with whom he released the lead single "Reset" from his second studio album Hyperion in the same month. In January 2019, he released a collaboration with The Weeknd titled "Lost in the Fire" as the second single from Hyperion, and later in March 2019 released another collaboration with Pharrell Williams titled "Blast Off". Hyperion was released on 8 March 2019, to mixed reviews. On 3 October 2019, Gesaffelstein announced his surprise EP Novo Sonic System, consisting of 6 tracks, which was released the following day.

For Apple's October 2021 event, his track "Orck" was used as the pre-intro and outro theme music.

Gesaffelstein announced a collaboration with fellow Kanye West collaborator KayCyy. TW20 50, an EP containing 3 collaborative songs between the two of them, released on 11 March 2022.

Musical style  
Mixmag describes Gesaffelstein's style as being a "dark and threatening techno, though enchanting"; The Inrocks see it as "black, ultra-violent music, [which] revives the techno fundamentals, the intransigence of Underground Resistance, the mental and obsessive structures of Drexciya, the contemporary power and more". Megan Buerger from the Washington Post describes his style as a mixture of dark and underground music, and notes that a specialty of the artist is his use of silences to create a "tension" before a "raucous explosion of bass and percussion". 

Rolling Stone magazine sees his music as being "a little more aggressive and punk-rock than normal".

Influences

Gesaffelstein cites Dopplereffekt, Kraftwerk, and new wave formations from the 80s such as D.A.F. or Nitzer Ebb all as references. He has also said Joy Division and The Hacker influenced his work.

Discography

Studio albums

Extended plays

Soundtracks

Singles

As lead artist

As featured artist

Other charted songs

Other appearances

Songwriting, production and technical credits

Remixes

Notes

References

External links

1987 births
Living people
French DJs
French electronic musicians
French songwriters
Male songwriters
Columbia Records artists
Owsla artists
Parlophone artists
Warner Music Sweden artists